In mathematics, in the area of algebraic topology, the homotopy extension property indicates which homotopies defined on a subspace can be extended to a homotopy defined on a larger space.  The homotopy extension property of cofibrations is dual to the homotopy lifting property that is used to define fibrations.

Definition
Let  be a topological space, and let .

That is, the pair  has the homotopy extension property if any map  can be extended to a map  (i.e.  and  agree on their common domain).

Visualisation
The homotopy extension property is depicted in the following diagram

If the above diagram (without the dashed map) commutes (this is equivalent to the conditions above), then pair (X,A) has the homotopy extension property if there exists a map  which makes the diagram commute. By currying, note that homotopies expressed as maps  are in  natural bijection with expressions as maps .

Note that this diagram is dual to (opposite to) that of the homotopy lifting property; this duality is loosely referred to as Eckmann–Hilton duality.

Properties
 A pair  has the homotopy extension property if and only if  is a retract of

Other
If  has the homotopy extension property, then the simple inclusion map  is a cofibration.

In fact, if you consider any cofibration , then we have that  is homeomorphic to its image under . This implies that any cofibration can be treated as an inclusion map, and therefore it can be treated as having the homotopy extension property.

See also
 Homotopy lifting property

References

 

Homotopy theory
Algebraic topology